Eriandra is a genus of flowering plants belonging to the family Polygalaceae.

Its native range is New Guinea.

Species:
 Eriandra fragrans P.Royen & Steenis

References

Polygalaceae
Fabales genera